Mac Cearbhaill is a Gaelic Irish clan belonging to the Three Collas kinship group, who were during the 11th and 12th centuries, kings of Airgíalla. Their name has been Anglicised as MacCarroll, Carroll, Carvill, MacCarville and various other spellings. The clan are associated especially with south-eastern Ulster and northern Leinster. They have numerous descendants in County Monaghan, County Louth, County Down, County Tyrone and elsewhere. In later times they were known as prominent musicians. The family lost out during the Norman invasion of Ireland, though their kinsmen the Mac Mathghamhna and Mag Uidhir hung on for longer.

Naming conventions

People

Kings

 Cu Caishil Ua Cerbaill, 1094-1101
 Donnchadh Ua Cearbaill, 1130–1168
 Murchard Ua Cerbaill, 1168–1189
 Muirchertach Ua Cerbaill, 1189–1194
 unknown, 1194-1196

Others
 Donn Shléibhe Mac Cerbaill (died 1357), Irish musician

McCarroll
Bonnie McCarroll (1897–1929), American rodeo performer
Jay McCarroll (born 1974), American fashion designer
June McCarroll (1867–1954), American nurse
Tony McCarroll (born 1971), English drummer

McCarville
Janel McCarville (born 1982), American women's basketball player
Krista McCarville (born 1982), Canadian curler

McCarvill
Chris McCarvill (born 1971), American musician

MacCarvill
Patrick MacCarvill (1893–1955), Irish politician

Carvill
Henry Carvill Lewis (1853–1888), American geologist and mineralogist
Michael Carvill (born 1988), Northern Irish footballer 
Patrick Carvill (1839–1924), Irish politician

See also
 Abbey of Mellifont
McCarroll Peak, a mountain in Antarctica

References

Bibliography
Livingstone, Peadar The Monaghan Story: A Documented History of the County Monaghan from the Earliest Times to 1976 (1980)
McCarville, James W. The McCarville/McCarvel Family Genealogy, 900 AD to 2002 AD (2002)
McCarville, Mary Michele American Doctor (2009)

External links
 Carroll of Oriel
 Family Tree DNA Study Group
 McCarville at John Grenham
 Mac Cearbhall at Library Ireland
 Carroll pedigree at Library Ireland

Gaelic-Irish nations and dynasties
Irish royal families
Surnames of Irish origin
Irish clans
Irish-language surnames